Charles William Robert Knight (1884–1957) M.C., F.R.P.S., F.Z.S. was a well known British falconer, and a writer on, and promoter of, falconry. He, and his star pupil – the eagle, Mr Ramshaw – feature prominently in the 1945 film I Know Where I'm Going!.

Knight was born at Sevenoaks, Kent, to Charles and Emily Knight; his brother, Frank, was the father of the actor Esmond Knight. Educated at Sevenoaks School, Knight joined the Queen's Own Royal West Kent Regiment on the outbreak of the First World War, serving as a sniper; he saw action at Ypres, Messines Ridge and the Somme, and was awarded the Military Cross. In 1917 he was promoted to captain in the 1st Battalion, Honourable Artillery Company, and went to the US in charge of a demonstration drill team. After the war, he worked in London as a tobacconist with his brother Frank, the Knight family business involving the importing of Havana cigars from Cuba. In 1924, he married Eva Olive Margaret Bennet; she died two years later. Knight died in Kenya in 1957, and received an obituary in The Times.

Knight, and his "patriotic poultry" – as Fred Allen once referred to the bird species – are perhaps most famous in the United States for their joint appearance on the March 20, 1940 episode of the Fred Allen radio show: Mr. Ramshaw flew, defecatingly, about NBC's Studio 8-H ignoring both Knight's entreaties and proffered chicken heads – throwing their segment, and the rest of the Allen program, into hysterical chaos.

Selected publications
Allen, Fred (1954). Treadmill To Oblivion. Boston, Little, Brown and Company (An Atlantic Monthly Press Book).
Knight, C. W. R. (1946). Aristocrats of the air. London, Williams and Norgate. 
Knight, C. W. R. (1933). Mr. Ramshaw, my eagle. London, Arrowsmith. 
Knight, C. W. R. (1922). Wild life in the tree tops. 53 illus. from photographs taken by the author. New York, G.H. Doran.

References

1884 births
1957 deaths
Falconry
People educated at Sevenoaks School